Coleophora dissecta is a moth of the family Coleophoridae. It is found in southern Russia and central Asia. It occurs in desert-steppe and desert biotopes.

Adults are on wing in early September.

The larvae feed on the carpels of Halocnemum strobiloceum.

References

dissecta
Moths described in 1989
Moths of Asia